The 2004–05 PBA Philippine Cup, or known as the 2004–05 Gran Matador Brandy-PBA Philippine Cup for sponsorship reasons, was the All-Filipino Conference of the Philippine Basketball Association's (PBA) 2004–05 season.

The Barangay Ginebra Kings won its first back-to-back titles with a 4–2 conquest of the Talk 'N Text Phone Pals. The series was marred by a controversial reversal of the Phone Pals' Game One victory after fielding in an ineligible Asi Taulava in the said game. Taulava was serving an indefinite suspension after being cited as one of six Filipino-American players with questionable citizenship papers.

Eric Menk won another Best Player of the Conference Award, his third in his PBA career.

Classification round

Team standings

Second seed playoff

Fourth seed playoff

Bracket

Wildcard phase
The #3 vs. #10 and the #4 vs. #9 matchups are in the "twice-to-beat" format; the team with the higher seed only needs to win once to advance, but needs to be beaten twice in order to be eliminated. The other two matchups are a best-of-three series.

(3) Shell vs. (10) Red Bull

(4) Alaska vs. (9) FedEx

(5) San Miguel vs. (8) Sta. Lucia

(6) Purefoods vs. (7) Coca-Cola

Quarterfinals

(3) Shell vs. (6) Purefoods

(4) Alaska vs. (5) San Miguel

Semifinals

(1) Barangay Ginebra vs. (5) San Miguel

(2) Talk 'N Text vs. (3) Shell

Third place playoff

Finals

On January 26, 2005, Judge Rogelio Pizarro of the Quezon City Regional Trial Court Branch 222 issued a writ of preliminary mandatory injunction "commanding and directing" the PBA to allow Taulava "to play in the current All Filipino Conference and succeeding Conferences of the PBA" during the term of his contract. This was after Taulava passed citizenship papers that should've allowed him to play in the league; earlier, he was indefinitely suspended from playing after his Filipino citizenship was nullified (only Filipinos are allowed to play in the Philippine Cup).

The PBA Board of Governors refused to honor the court order, upholding Commissioner Noli Eala's suspension of Taulava after consultation with the league's legal counsel. Taulava's lawyer Ed Francisco charged Eala with giving the board wrong legal advice. Taulava did play at Game 1, in which Talk 'N Text won easily 89–71. As Taulava was being introduced, the pro-Ginebra crowd jeered him as the outnumbered Talk 'N Text crowd greeted him with cheers, displaying placards with a message "Welcome Back!" Eala himself had considered quitting his commissioner's post as he received a phone call "to make sure that Asi Taulava be allowed to play". After the game, Barangay Ginebra filed a protest to the commissioner's office. Talk 'N Text intends to play Taulava for the entire duration of the series.

Barangay Ginebra reportedly indicated that the team may forfeit the Finals series if Taulava continues to be allowed to play and Game 1 won't be forfeited. The league has issued a motion for reconsideration on the court order, and Eala said that Talk 'N Text may face sanctions for violating league rules. In a board meeting on February 1, there was a "heated clash" between Eala and Talk 'N Text alternate representative Paul Gueco in which Gueco reportedly challenged Eala to make a decision on the Taulava case by himself and to tell Talk N Text what his decision was, a statement supported by board chairman Buddy Encarnado of the Sta. Lucia Realtors.

Talk 'N Text did not field Taulava in Game 2 "in the interest of the Philippine Basketball Association and the public", even though Eala was filed of contempt charges, and Talk 'N Text's Game 1 win was forfeited against Ginebra. The Gin Kings won against Talk 'N Text by one point, thanks to Eric Menk's last basket with 5.2 seconds left to play. Ginebra's defense disallowed an attempt from the Phone Pals, leading to the 2–0 series lead.

Francisco pointed out that new rules and regulations covering the eligibility of Filipino-foreign players such as Taulava, who was declared eligible by the PBA based on the Bureau of Immigration clearance and Department of Justice (DOJ) affirmation in 2001, cannot be subject to additional rules or conditions imposed retroactively and any such changes can only be applied prospectively. The DOJ, for its part, considered on intervening and seek a reversal of the court's ruling allowing the cager to play anew in the PBA despite the DOJ's findings that he is not a Filipino; although they won't intervene if the Court of Appeals would rule favorably on the justice department's petition seeking to lift an injunction against it issued by the Manila RTC on the separate issue of Taulava's deportation. DOJ Secretary Raul Gonzalez said that the rulings of the Quezon City and Manila RTC constitute "undue interference by the courts." Parañaque Congressman Eduardo Zialcita would seek a congressional inquiry into Eala's "continued defiance" on the court orders.

Negros Oriental Congressman Jacinto Paras asked the Games and Amusement Board (GAB) to investigate Eala for his "questionable and dictatorial acts" as the PBA is under the direct jurisdiction of the GAB. Meanwhile, the Phone Pals appealed to the Board of Governors to reverse Eala's prior decisions of forfeiting game 1 and for the reinstatement of Taulava. Meanwhile, with all of the publicity, the tournament scored the highest TV ratings in years, with ratings of at least 11% and an audience share of at least 17.4%.

References

External links
 PBA.ph

Philippine Cup
PBA Philippine Cup